O’Donoghue’s Pub (also known as O'Donoghue's Bar) is a historically significant drinking establishment located at 15 Merrion Row, Dublin 2, Ireland—near St. Stephen's Green on Dublin’s south side.  Built in 1789 as a grocery store, it began operating full-time as a pub when purchased by the O’Donoghue family in 1934.

History
This pub is closely associated with Irish traditional music and was where the popular Irish folk group, The Dubliners, began performing in the early 1960s.

Many other notable Irish musicians—including Séamus Ennis, Joe Heaney, Andy Irvine,  Christy Moore, The Fureys and Phil Lynott—have played at O’Donoghue’s, and their photographs are displayed in the pub.

Included are portraits of The Dubliners themselves: the five founding members Ronnie Drew, Luke Kelly, Ciarán Bourke, John Sheahan and Barney McKenna, as well as later members Eamonn Campbell and Seán Cannon; these photographs hang to the right of the entrance, where the nightly sessions are played.

Andy Irvine wrote the tribute song "O'Donoghue's", in which he reminisces about his early days in Dublin—when he first started frequenting the pub in August 1962. The song was released on the album Changing Trains (2007).

Dessie Hynes from Longford bought the bar from Paddy and Maureen O'Donoghue in 1977 and ran the pub with his family for 11 years.

In 1988, O’Donoghue’s was purchased by publicans Oliver Barden and John Mahon. Barden is still the proprietor and continues to run the pub with his family and staff to this day.

See also
 List of pubs in Dublin

References

External links
O'Donoghue's Pub Website

Pubs in Dublin (city)
The Dubliners